Jenimy Cravid Sacramento de Sousa (born 20 February 1987), simply known as Jenimy, is a São Toméan footballer who plays as a goalkeeper for Northern Irish club Sofia Farmer and the São Tomé and Príncipe national team. He also holds Portuguese citizenship.

International career
Jenimy made his debut for São Tomé and Príncipe on 4 September 2016 in a 2017 Africa Cup of Nations qualification 0–2 loss against Morocco.

References

External links

1987 births
Living people
São Tomé and Príncipe footballers
Association football goalkeepers
São Tomé and Príncipe international footballers
São Tomé and Príncipe expatriate footballers
São Tomé and Príncipe expatriate sportspeople in Portugal
Expatriate footballers in Portugal
Expatriate association footballers in Northern Ireland
Sofia Farmer F.C. players